In aerodynamics, the critical Mach number (Mcr or M*) of an aircraft is the lowest Mach number at which the airflow over some point of the aircraft reaches the speed of sound, but does not exceed it. At the lower critical Mach number, airflow around the entire aircraft is subsonic. Supersonic aircraft such as Concorde and combat aircraft also have an upper critical Mach number at which the airflow around the entire aircraft is supersonic.

Aircraft flight
For an aircraft in flight, the speed of the airflow around the aircraft differs considerably in places from the airspeed of the aircraft; this is due to the airflow having to speed up and slow down as it travels around the aircraft's structure.  When the aircraft's airspeed reaches the critical Mach number, the speed of the airflow in some areas near the airframe reaches the speed of sound, even though the aircraft itself has an airspeed lower than Mach 1.0.  This creates a weak shock wave.  As the aircraft exceeds the critical Mach number, its drag coefficient increases suddenly, causing dramatically increased drag, and, in an aircraft not designed for transonic or supersonic speeds, changes to the airflow over the flight control surfaces lead to deterioration in control of the aircraft.

In aircraft not designed to fly at or above the critical Mach number, the shock waves that form in the airflow over the wing and tailplane are sufficient to stall the wing, render the control surfaces ineffective, or lead to loss of control of the aircraft (such as Mach tuck, when shock waves in the airflow over the elevator send the aircraft into an uncontrollable dive).  These problematic phenomena appearing at or above the critical Mach number became known as compressibility.  Compressibility led to a number of accidents involving high-speed military and experimental aircraft in the 1930s and 1940s.

Although unknown at the time, compressibility was the cause of the phenomenon known as the sound barrier.  1940s-era military subsonic aircraft, such as the Supermarine Spitfire, Bf 109, P-51 Mustang, Gloster Meteor, He 162, and P-80, have relatively thick, unswept wings, and are incapable of reaching Mach 1.0 in controlled flight.  In 1947, Chuck Yeager flew the Bell X-1 (also with an unswept wing, but a much thinner one), reaching Mach 1.06 and beyond, and the sound barrier was finally broken.

Early transonic military aircraft, such as the Hawker Hunter and F-86 Sabre, were designed to fly satisfactorily even at speeds greater than their critical Mach number.  They did not possess sufficient engine thrust to break the sound barrier in level flight, but could exceed Mach 1.0 in a dive while remaining controllable.  Modern jet airliners, such as Airbus and Boeing aircraft, have maximum operating Mach numbers slower than Mach 1.0.

Supersonic aircraft, such as Concorde, Tu-144, the English Electric Lightning, Lockheed F-104, Dassault Mirage III, and MiG 21, are designed to exceed Mach 1.0 in level flight, and are therefore designed with very thin wings. Their critical Mach numbers are higher than those of subsonic and transonic aircraft, but are still less than Mach 1.0.

The actual critical Mach number varies from wing to wing.  In general, a thicker wing will have a lower critical Mach number, because a thicker wing deflects the airflow passing around it more than a thinner wing does, and thus accelerates the airflow to a faster speed.  For instance, the fairly-thick wing on the P-38 Lightning has a critical Mach number of about .69.  The aircraft could occasionally reach this speed in dives, leading to a number of crashes.  The Supermarine Spitfire's much thinner wing gave it a considerably higher critical Mach number (about 0.89).

See also
Drag divergence Mach number

References 
 L. J. Clancy (1975) Aerodynamics, Pitman Publishing Limited, London

Notes 

Aerodynamics